Sierra Leone participated at the 2018 Summer Youth Olympics in Buenos Aires, Argentina from 6 October to 18 October 2018.

Competitors
The following is the list of number of competitors participating at the Games per sport/discipline.

Athletics

Beach Volleyball

 Girls' tournament - 1 team of 2 athletes

Swimming

See also
Sierra Leone at the 2018 Commonwealth Games

References

2018 in Sierra Leonean sport 
Nations at the 2018 Summer Youth Olympics
Sierra Leone at the Youth Olympics